Alone Together is a 2022 American romantic drama film written and directed by Katie Holmes. The film stars Holmes, Jim Sturgess, Derek Luke, Melissa Leo, Zosia Mamet, and Becky Ann Baker. It premiered at the Tribeca Film Festival on July 14, 2022 and was released in the United States on July 22, 2022, by Vertical Entertainment.

Synopsis 
The film centers around two strangers who are sharing an Airbnb in New York City during the COVID-19 lockdown.

Cast 

 Katie Holmes as June
 Jim Sturgess as Charlie
 Derek Luke as John
 Melissa Leo as Deborah
 Zosia Mamet as Margaret
 Becky Ann Baker as Jan

Production 
Katie Holmes wrote the film at the very beginning of lockdown in 2020. Alone Together, produced by her new production company called Lafayette Pictures, is her second film as director. She produced the film with Jordan Yale Levine, Jordan Beckerman and Jesse Korman of Yale Productions, and Shaun Sanghani, owner of SSS Entertainment.

Release 
The film had its world premiere at the Tribeca Film Festival on July 14, 2022. Vertical Entertainment acquired North American distribution rights. The film was theatrically released on July 22, 2022 and was released on video on demand on July 29, 2022.

Reception 
Review aggregator Rotten Tomatoes reports that 30% of 37 critics gave the film a positive review, for an average rating of 4.70 out of 10. The site's critics consensus reads: "Director Katie Holmes takes an appealingly low-key approach to her story, but it isn't enough to offset Alone Together's bland characters and overall predictability."

References

External links 

 
 
 
 
 

2022 romantic drama films
Vertical Entertainment films
American romantic drama films
2020s English-language films
Films about the COVID-19 pandemic
2020s American films